Dracontomyia is a genus of the family Tephritidae, better known as fruit flies.

Species
Dracontomyia footei Aczél, 1953
Dracontomyia riveti Becker, 1919

References

Tephritinae
Tephritidae genera
Diptera of South America
Taxa named by Theodor Becker